Richardson is an English surname of Middle English origin.
The prefix Richard is a given name derived from the Old French ric ("power") and hard ("brave"/"hardy"). The suffix -son denotes "son/descendant of". The names Richard and Richardson are found in records as early as 1381 in Yorkshire, England. There are variant spellings including the Swedish Richardsson. People with the name Richardson or its variants include:

A
A. J. Richardson (born 1995), American football player
Abby Sage Richardson (1837–1900), American writer and center of a notorious murder trial
Adam Richardson (born 1974), Australian rules footballer
Al Richardson (disambiguation), multiple people
Alan Richardson (disambiguation), multiple people called Alan, Allan, or Allen
Albert Richardson (disambiguation), multiple people
Alexander Richardson (disambiguation), multiple people called Alexander or Alex
Alice Richardson (born 1986), English rugby union player
Andrea Richardson (born 1962), American pathologist and physician-scientist
Andrew Richardson (disambiguation), multiple people called Andrew or Andy
Angela Richardson, British Member of Parliament elected 2019
Anthony Richardson (disambiguation), multiple people called Anthony
Antonio Richardson (born 1992), American football offensive tackle
Anna Richardson (presenter), British television presenter
Anna Ryder Richardson, British interior designer
Anne Richardson (disambiguation), multiple people
Antoan Richardson (born 1983), Bahamian Major League Baseball outfielder and coach
April Richardson (born 1979), American stand-up comedian
Archibald Read Richardson, British mathematician
Arlan Richardson, American Professor of Geriatric Medicine
Arnold Richardson (born 1928), Canadian curler
Arnold Edwin Victor Richardson (1883–1949) Australian scientist and administrator
Art Richardson, American Major League Baseball second baseman
Arthur Richardson (disambiguation), multiple people
Ashley Richardson, American supermodel
Athol Richardson (1897–1982), Australian politician and judge

B
Barbara Richardson (born 1949), wife of Bill Richardson
Barry Richardson (disambiguation), multiple people
Ben Richardson, British cinematographer
Sir Benjamin Ward Richardson (1828–1896), British physician
Bert Richardson (disambiguation), multiple people
Bertram Richardson (1932–2020), English cricketer
Blake Richardson (drummer) (born 1985), American drummer
Blake Richardson (singer) (born 1999), American singer
Bob Richardson (disambiguation), multiple people called Bob or Bobby
Bonnie Richardson (born 1990), American track and field athlete
Brad Richardson (born 1985), Canadian professional ice hockey centre
Brian Richardson (disambiguation), multiple people
Bryan Richardson (born 1944), English cricketer
Bucky Richardson (born 1969), American football quarterback
Burton Richardson (born 1949), American television announcer

C
Calvin Richardson (born 1976), American R&B and soul singer-songwriter
Cameron Richardson (born 1979), American actress and model
Cameron Richardson (born 1987), Australian rules footballer
Carl Richardson (born 1921), American football coach
Carsten Richardson, early 17th-century Holsteinian-Danish naval officer and Arctic explorer
Cecil R. Richardson, USAF chaplain
Chad Richardson (born 1970), Canadian musician
Charles Richardson (disambiguation) list of people named "Charles Richardson"
Charlie and Eddie Richardson, leaders of The Richardson Gang in Britain
Charlotte Caroline Richardson (1796–1854), British poet and writer
Chris Richardson (born 1984), American singer-songwriter
Christian Richardson (born 1972), Irish TV presenter and radio DJ
Claude Richardson (1900–1969), Canadian politician
Clif Richardson (1943–2020), American politician
Clint Richardson (born 1956), American professional basketball player
Clive Richardson (born 1932), South African cricketer
Colin Richardson, British record producer, mixer and recording engineer
Colin Richardson (born 1958), English motorcycle speedway rider
Constance Stewart-Richardson (1883–1932), British dancer and author
Curtis B. Richardson (born 1956), American politician
Cyril Richardson (1909–1976), English-born American Christian theologian
Cyril Richardson (born 1990), American football guard

D
Damien Richardson (disambiguation), multiple people
Danny Richardson (1863–1926), American professional baseball player
Darrell C. Richardson (1918–2006), American Baptist minister, bibliographer and author
Darwin Richardson (1812–1860), Mormon pioneer
Daryl Richardson (born 1990), American football running back
Dave Richardson (footballer)
David Richardson (disambiguation), multiple people called Dave or David
Davy Richardson (born 1962), English darts player
Dawn Richardson (born 1964), American rock drummer, teacher, and writer
Dennis Richardson (disambiguation), multiple people
Derek Richardson (disambiguation), multiple people
Desmond Richardson, American dancer
Diana Richardson, American politician
Dick Richardson (disambiguation), multiple people
Dina Richardson, American singer and songwriter
Dominique Richardson (born 1992), Bermudian footballer
Don Richardson (disambiguation), multiple people
Donna Richardson (born 1962), American fitness and aerobics instructor
Dorothy Richardson (1873–1957), English writer
Dot Richardson (born 1961), American softball player
Douglas Richardson (born 1951), US genealogist and historian
Doug Richardson, American screenwriter and novelist
Dustin Richardson (born 1984), American professional baseball pitcher
D'Vontrey Richardson (born 1988), American professional baseball player

E
Earl Richardson (disambiguation), multiple people
Edgar Preston Richardson (1902–1985), American art historian and museum director
Edmund Richardson (1818–1886), American entrepreneur
Edward Richardson (disambiguation), multiple people called Edward, Eddie or Ted
Eimear Richardson (born 1986), Irish cricketer
Elena Carter Richardson (1948–2006), American ballerina and dance instructor
Elizabeth Richardson (disambiguation), multiple people
Elliot Richardson (1920–1999), American politician
Emanuel Richardson, American college basketball coach
Emeline Hill Richardson (1910–1999), American classical archaeologist
Erasmus Richardson, American politician
 Eric Richardson (Australian footballer) (1891–1969), Australian rules footballer
 Eric Richardson (American football) (born 1962), American wide receiver
Ernest Richardson (disambiguation), multiple people
Ernie Richardson (footballer) (1916–1977), English professional footballer
Ernie Richardson (born 1931), Canadian curling champion
Esther K. Richardson, Hawaii territorial representative

F
Ferdinando Richardson (1558–1618), English courtier and musician
Fiona Richardson (1966–2017), Australian politician
Frances Mary Richardson Currer (1785–1861), British heiress and book collector
Frank Richardson (1897–1970), Australian rules footballer
Frank Richardson (1897–1987), English footballer
Frank Richardson (1898–1962), American film director and screenwriter
Frank K. Richardson (1914–1999), American jurist
Frazer Richardson, English footballer
Frederick Richardson (disambiguation), multiple people 
Friend Richardson (1865–1943), American newspaper publisher and politician

G
Garnet Richardson (1933–2016), Canadian curler
Garth Richardson, Canadian music producer and engineer
Gary Richardson (disambiguation), multiple people
Gemma Richardson, English boxer
Geoff Richardson (disambiguation), multiple people called Geoff or Geoffrey
Geordie Richardson (1835–1905), New Zealand merchant and ship owner
George Richardson (disambiguation), multiple people
Gerry Richardson (1932–1971), murdered English police officer
Glen Richardson (born 1955), Canadian professional ice hockey player
Gloria Richardson (1922–2021), American civil rights leader
Gloster Richardson (1942–2020), professional American football player
Gordie Richardson (born 1938), American professional baseball player
Gordon Richardson, Baron Richardson of Duntisbourne (1915–2010), British banker and lawyer
Grady Richardson (born 1952), American football tight end
Graham Richardson, Australian politician
Graham Richardson (born 1970), Canadian television journalist
Greg Richardson (born 1958), American boxer
Gregory Richardson (born 1982), Guyanese footballer
Grover C. Richardson (1948–2014), American politician
Guy Richardson (1921–1965), British rower

H
H. Richardson, New Zealand cricketer
H. L. Richardson (1927–2020), American politician
Hadley Richardson (1891–1979), first wife of American author Ernest Hemingway
Ham Richardson (1933–2006), American tennis player
Hamilton Richardson (1820–1906), American businessman
Hardy Richardson (1855–1931), American professional baseball player
Harriet Richardson (1874–1958), American carcinologist
Harry Richardson (disambiguation), multiple people called Harry or Harold
Heather Richardson-Bergsma (born 1989), American speedskater
Helen Richardson (disambiguation), multiple people
Henry Richardson (disambiguation), multiple people
Herbert Richardson (disambiguation), multiple people
Hester Dorsey Richardson (1862-1933), American author
Holden C. Richardson (1878–1960), United States Navy officer and naval aviation pioneer
Hollon Richardson (1835–1916), American Union Army officer
Horace Richardson (American football) (born 1993), American football player
Howard Richardson (disambiguation), multiple people
Hugh Richardson (disambiguation), multiple people

I
Ian Richardson (disambiguation), multiple people
Iliff David Richardson (1918–2001), US officer
Ira Richardson (1871–1958), American academic
Israel Bush Richardson (1815–1862), American general
Ivie Richardson (1895–1960), South African tennis player
Ivor Richardson (1930–2014), New Zealand jurist and legal writer

J
J. Richardson, English cricketer
Jack Richardson (disambiguation), multiple people
Jackie Richardson, Canadian singer and actress
Jackson Richardson (born 1969), French handball player
Jake Richardson (born 1985), American actor
James Richardson (disambiguation), multiple people
Jane Richardson (disambiguation), multiple people
Jason Richardson (disambiguation), multiple people
Jay Richardson (born 1984), American football linebacker
Jayme Richardson (born 1989),  Australian Paralympic cyclist
Jeff Richardson (disambiguation), several people
Jeramie Richardson (born 1983), American football fullback
Jerome Richardson (1920–2000), American jazz musician
Jerry Richardson (1936–2023), American NFL player
Jess Richardson (1930–1975), American Professional Football player
Jhye Richardson (born 1996), Australian cricketer
Jiles Perry Richardson (The Big Bopper) (1930–1959), American rock and roll musician
Jillian Richardson (born 1965), Canadian athlete
Jim Richardson (born 1941), English jazz bassist
Jo Richardson, British politician
Jock Richardson (1911–1986), Scottish footballer
Joely Richardson, British actress
John Richardson (disambiguation) multiple people by this name
John V. Richardson Jr. (born 1949), American professor
Johnson William Richardson (1834–1862), first westbound rider for the Pony Express
Johnstone Richardson (1899–1994), New Zealand rugby union player
Jon Richardson, comedian
Jonathan Richardson (disambiguation), multiple people
Jorge Richardson (born 1976), Puerto Rican track and field athlete
Joseph Richardson (disambiguation), multiple people called Joseph or Joe
Josh Richardson (born 1993), American professional basketball player
Julie Richardson, former professional tennis player
Julieanna Richardson (born 1954), American lawyer

K
Kane Richardson born (1991), Australian international cricketer
Kareem Richardson (born 1974), American basketball coach
Karena Richardson (born 1959), British ice skater
Kate Richardson (disambiguation), multiple people
Katherine Richardson (disambiguation), multiple people called Catherine, Cathy, Katharine, Katherine, Kathy, or Katie
Kathleen Richardson (disambiguation), multiple people
Kaylin Richardson (born 1984), American alpine ski racer
Keith Richardson (disambiguation), multiple people
Kelly Richardson (born 1972), Canadian artist
Ken Richardson (disambiguation), multiple people called Ken or Kenneth
Kent Richardson (born 1987), American football cornerback
Kevin Richardson (disambiguation), multiple people
Kieran Richardson, English footballer
Kieron Richardson (born 1986), English actor
Kyle Richardson (born 1973), American National Football League punter
Kyle Richardson (born 1987), Australian freestyle swimmer
Kym Richardson, Australian politician

L
LaTanya Richardson (born 1949), American actress and producer
Laura Richardson (born 1962), American politician
Lawrence Richardson (disambiguation), multiple people called Lawrence, Larry, or Laurence
Leam Richardson, English footballer
Leander Richardson (1856–1918), American journalist, playwright, theatrical writer and author
Lee Richardson (disambiguation), multiple people
Leigh Richardson (1924–2008), Honduran-born Belizean politician
Len Richardson (disambiguation), multiple people
Leon Richardson (born 1957), Antiguan cyclist
Levi Richardson (1851–1879), American gunman, gambler and buffalo hunter
Lewis Richardson, English boxer
Lewis Fry Richardson (1881–1953), English mathematician
Linsdall Richardson (1881–1967), British geologist
Liza Richardson, American music supervisor
Lloyd Richardson, Sint Maarten politician and physician
Lorne Richardson (born 1950), Canadian Football League defensive back
Louie Richardson (born 1985), professional Canadian football defensive end
Louise Richardson, Irish academic, Principal of the University of St Andrews
Luke Richardson (born 1969), Canadian hockey player
Lunsford Richardson (1854–1919), U.S. pharmacist
Lyndel Richardson (born 1986), Anguillan cricketer
Lynn Richardson, Canadian artist and sculptor

M
Maisie Richardson-Sellers (born 1992), English actress
Malachi Richardson (born 1996), American professional basketball player
Marc, Debra, and Jacob Richardson, Canadian victims of the Richardson family murders in 2006
Marcus Richardson (born 1984), American football linebacker
Marcia Richardson (born 1972), English athlete
Marie Richardson (born 1959), Swedish stage and film actress
Margaret Richardson (disambiguation), multiple people
Marion Richardson (1892–1946), British educator and author
Mark Richardson (disambiguation), multiple people
Marque Richardson (born 1985), American actor
Martin Richardson (born 1941), British-American scientist
Marvin Thomas Richardson (born 1941), American politician
Mary Richardson (1882/3?–1961), Canadian suffragette and vandalist
Matterral Richardson (born 1985), American Football cornerback
Matthew Richardson (disambiguation), multiple people
Maurice Howe Richardson (1851–1912), US surgeon and inventor
Max Richardson (born 1948), Australian rules footballer
Max Richardson (sailor), British sailor
Mel Richardson, American politician
Michael Richardson (disambiguation), multiple people called Michael or Mike
Michele Richardson (born 1969), American competition swimmer 
Mick Richardson (1874–1920), English footballer
Midge Richardson (1930–2012), American nun and educator
Milo Barnum Richardson (1849–1912), American politician
J. Milton Richardson (1913–1980), bishop of the Episcopal Diocese of Texas
Miranda Richardson, British actress

N
Naazim Richardson (died 2020), American boxer and boxing trainer
Naomi Sewell Richardson (1892–1993), American suffragist
Natasha Richardson (1963–2009), British actress
Neil Richardson (disambiguation), multiple people
Nicholas Richardson, British Classical scholar
Nick Richardson, English footballer
Nicole Richardson (born 1970), Australian softball player
Nolan Richardson (born 1941), American basketball head coach
Nolan Richardson III (1964–2012), American college basketball coach
Nolen Richardson (1903–1951), American baseball player
Norman Richardson (disambiguation), multiple people called Norman or Norm

O
Origen Richardson (1795–1876), American politician
Owen Willans Richardson (1879–1959), English physicist

P
Paddy Richardson, New Zealand writer
Passion Richardson (born 1975), American former sprint athlete
Patricia Richardson, American actress
Patricia Richardson, British politician
Paul Richardson (disambiguation), multiple people
Perry Richardson (born 1963), American rock bassist
Perry Richardson Bass (1914–2006), an American heir, investor and philanthropist
Peter Richardson (disambiguation), multiple people
Philip Richardson, New Zealand Anglican bishop
Phillip Richardson (cyclist) (born 1949), Trinidad cyclist
Phillip J. S. Richardson (1875–1973), British writer on dance
Pooh Richardson (born 1966), American basketball player

Q
Quentin Richardson (b. 1980), NBA basketball player

R
Ralph Richardson (1812–1897), New Zealand politician
Sir Ralph Richardson (1902–1983), British actor
Rex Richardson (born 1983), American politician
Ric Richardson (born 1962), Australian litigant and inventor
Richard Richardson (disambiguation), multiple people called Richard or Richie
Rico Richardson (born 1991), American football player
Robert Richardson (disambiguation), multiple people
Robin Richardson, Progressive Conservative party member of the Canadian House of Commons
Roger Wolcott Richardson (1930–1993), American mathematician
Roland Richardson (1878–1949), Canadian-American mathematician
Ron Richardson (1952–1995), American actor and operatic baritone
Ronald Richardson (1927–1998), English cricketer
Roy Richardson (born 1963), former Sint Maartener cricketer
Rupert Richardson (1930–2008), American Civil Rights activist
Russell Richardson (born 1977), Australian professional rugby league footballer
Ruth Richardson (born 1950), New Zealand politician

S
Salli Richardson, American television and film actress
Samuel Richardson (disambiguation), multiple people called Samuel or Sam
Sarah Richardson (born 1971), Canadian designer and television personality
Scott Richardson (born 1977), English first-class cricketer
Sean Richardson (disambiguation), multiple people 
Sha'Carri Richardson (born 2000), American sprinter 
 Shane Richardson (rugby league), Australian rugby league administrator
 Shane Richardson (American football), American football coach and player
Shannon Richardson (born 1977), American actress and convicted felon
Shaquille Richardson (born 1992), American football player
Shaun Richardson (born 1985), Arena football linebacker
Shayna Richardson (born 1984), student skydiver
Sheldon Richardson (born 1990), American football defensive end
Sid W. Richardson (1891–1959), Texas businessman and philanthropist
Simon Richardson (disambiguation), multiple people
Soko Richardson (1939–2004), American rhythm and blues drummer
Spec Richardson (1922–2016), American baseball manager
Steve Richardson (disambiguation), multiple people called Steve, Steven, or Stephen
Stuart Richardson, bassist for the Welsh band Lostprophets
Susan Richardson (disambiguation), multiple people
Sy Richardson (born 1941), American film and television actor
Sylvan Richardson, British guitarist and composer
Sylvia Richardson, French Bayesian statistician

T
Terry Richardson (born 1965), American fashion photographer
Terry Richardson (ice hockey) (born 1953), Canadian ice hockey player
Terry Richardson (rugby league), English professional rugby league footballer
Thomas Richardson (disambiguation) list of people named "Thomas Richardson"
Tim Richardson (disambiguation), multiple people
Todd Richardson (born 1976), American politician
Tom Richardson (1870–1912), English cricketer
Tom Richardson (1883–1939), American Major League Baseball player
Tony Richardson (disambiguation), multiple people
Tracey Richardson (born 1982), British diver
Trent Richardson (born 1990), American football running back

U
Udney Richardson (1869–1943), Canadian politician

V
Vaughan Richardson (died 1729), English organist and composer
Victor Richardson (disambiguation), multiple people called Victor or Vic

W
Wally Richardson, English footballer
Wally Richardson (born 1974), American football quarterback
Walter Richardson (disambiguation) list of people named Walter
Wayne Richardson (born 1946), Australian rules footballer
Wendy Richardson (born 1933), Australian playwright
Wes Richardson (1930–2011), Canadian curler
Wilds P. Richardson (1861–1929), American explorer and geographer
William Richardson (disambiguation) list of people named William, Bill, Billy, Will, or Willie
Willis Richardson (1889–1977), American playwright
Willis Richardson, American professional football player-coach
Wyman Richardson (1896–1953), American physician and author

Y
Yvette Richardson, American meteorologist and expert on severe convection/tornadoes

References

English-language surnames
Surnames of Old English origin
Surnames of English origin
Patronymic surnames
Surnames from given names